Abantis pseudonigeriana, the beige paradise skipper, is a butterfly in the family Hesperiidae. It is found in eastern Senegal, Guinea, northern Sierra Leone, northern Ghana and Nigeria. The habitat consists of dry savanna.

Adult males have been found feeding on dead turtles and dead fish but are also attracted to flowers.  There is a dry-season and a wet-season form.

References

Butterflies described in 1984
Tagiadini